Luke Jacobz (born Luke Jacob Ashwood; 14 February 1981) is an Australian actor and television presenter.

Career
He appeared in a high school production of The Man of Steel in 1995. He came to public attention when he starred as Zac Croft for two years on the Australian teen drama television series Heartbreak High. He later moved on to hosting television programs such as The Big Arvo and Popstars Live.

Jacobz made a return to acting in McLeod's Daughters as Patrick Brewer, appearing on the show between 2005 and 2008. He also appeared in a six-month recurring role as Angelo Rosetta in Home and Away, where after becoming a viewer favourite, he was then upgraded to series regular. 

In 2008, Jacobz was crowned Dancing with the Stars champion along with dancer and mentor Luda Kroitor.

Jacobz hosted seasons 2 through to 7 of The X Factor, from 2010 to 2015.

Jacobz returned to television in 2017 to host Instant Hotel.

In 2019, Jacobz was a contestant in the fifth Australian season of I'm A Celebrity...Get Me Out of Here! 

From 13 August 2020 he returned to Home and Away, again playing Angelo Rosetta in a recurring role. He will depart the series on 26 November 2020.

Awards
In 2010, Jacobz was nominated for the Silver Logie Award for the most popular actor for his role on Home and Away.

Personal life
"Jacobz" is a screen name, derived from adding a 'z' to the actor's middle name of Jacob. 
Jacobz dated his Dancing with the Stars partner Luda Kroitor in 2009, but the relationship ended some time later. 
He has one brother (Ben Ashwood), mother (Sue Ashwood) and deceased father (John Ashwood).

Jacobz was charged with drink driving on 31 May 2015 in Sydney, returning a 0.116 reading, well above the 0.05 limit. In court, he pleaded guilty and lost his licence for 12 months and was fined AU$700.

Filmography

References

External links

Living people
1981 births
Australian television presenters
Australian male soap opera actors
Dancing with the Stars (Australian TV series) winners
I'm a Celebrity...Get Me Out of Here! (Australian TV series) participants